S&S may refer to:
Sense and Sensibility, a novel by Jane Austen
Salt and Sanctuary, a video game
Sword and sorcery, a subgenre of fantasy and historical fantasy
Simon & Schuster, a publisher
S&S Cycle, a manufacturer of aftermarket engine parts and proprietary engines
S&S Worldwide, a designer and builder of amusement park rides, including roller coasters
Sparkman & Stephens, a yacht design firm founded by Olin Stephens